Poiana Vadului (until 1968 Neagra;) is a commune located in Alba County, Transylvania, Romania. It has a population of 1,139, and is composed of eleven villages: Costești, Duduieni, Făgetu de Jos, Făgetu de Sus, Hănășești, Lupăiești, Morcănești, Păștești, Petelei, Poiana Vadului and Stănești.

The commune is located in the northwestern corner of the county, in the Bihor Mountains (part of the Apuseni Mountains range).

References

Communes in Alba County
Localities in Transylvania